Judith Hird-Boal (born c. 1946) was ordained as the pastor of the Holy Cross Lutheran Church in Toms River, New Jersey, on June 20, 1972. This made her the first woman pastor of a Lutheran church.

References

Gross, Ernie. This Day In Religion. New York:Neal-Schuman Publications, 1990. .

People from Toms River, New Jersey
21st-century American Lutheran clergy
1940s births
Living people
Women Lutheran clergy
20th-century American Lutheran clergy